Astron-6 is a Canadian film production and directing company founded in 2007 by Adam Brooks and Jeremy Gillespie. The company later expanded to include Matt Kennedy, Conor Sweeney and Steven Kostanski, who are now equal partners in the company. Astron-6 is known for producing low-budget, 1980s-centric independent movies that often combine horror with comedy. 

A planned 2012 documentary No Sleep, No Surrender, which detailed the making and production of their 2011 film Father's Day, was never completed, though a teaser trailer was released. The follow-up to Father's Day, a Giallo-inspired horror comedy, The Editor, was directed by Adam Brooks and Matthew Kennedy in 2014. 

In 2016, Astron-6 produced the web series Divorced Dad. The series was described by the filmmakers as 'a love letter to the endearingly incompetent cable access television shows created by far from screen-ready small town celebrities during the 1980s and 90s'.

Gillespie and Kostanski directed the 2016 horror film The Void, intended as a departure from Astron-6's more comedic work. The film showcases more of Kostanski's creature and practical effects as seen in Astron-6's earlier films.

Filmography 
Astron-6 (2011, compilation DVD) 
Manborg (2011)
Father's Day (2011) 
The Editor (2014)
"W is for Wish" in ABCs of Death 2 (2014)
The Void (2016)
Leprechaun Returns (2018)
Divorced Dad (2019) — 7-episode series
Chowboys: An American Folktale (2019)
Psycho Goreman (2020)
"Veggie Masher commercial" in "Storm Drain" segment for V/H/S/94 (2021)

References

External links 
 

Companies based in Winnipeg
Canadian companies established in 2007
Film production companies of Canada
2007 establishments in Manitoba